Elizabeth Amolofo (born 2 September 1981) is a Ghanaian sprinter who specializes in the 200 metres.

International competitions

Personal bests
100 metres - 11.91 s (2006)
200 metres - 24.12 s (2007)

External links

1981 births
Living people
Ghanaian female sprinters
Commonwealth Games silver medallists for Ghana
Commonwealth Games medallists in athletics
Athletes (track and field) at the 2010 Commonwealth Games
Athletes (track and field) at the 2006 Commonwealth Games
Athletes (track and field) at the 2007 All-Africa Games
African Games competitors for Ghana
Medallists at the 2010 Commonwealth Games